SpiralScouts International is a United States-based youth organization based on Wiccan symbolism and values.

History
The program was created in 1999 as a loosely organized children's program at the Aquarian Tabernacle Church (ATC) in Index, Washington. The leader of the first circle was Heather Osterman. As word spread over the internet about the program, Pete Pathfinder Davis, founder of the Aquarian Tabernacle Church and SpiralScouts, implemented a formalized and expanded program under the guidance of Justine Goodwin, the first International Director, making it available internationally in 2001. With the aid of an internet committee of some 500, the original handbook was developed. Over time, the program has spread across the globe.

Philosophy
SpiralScouts is a program where girls and boys of minority faiths can work, grow, and learn together. Pete Davis stated in reference to the group, "There needs to be a group that will include all children and families, regardless of creed, color, gender, or sexual orientation.  Boys and girls should learn together, just like in the real world, not segregating little soldiers over here and little homemakers over there". SpiralScouts International promotes learning, peace, personal and environmental responsibility and service to one's community. Its activities are based on the classical basic elements of earth, air, fire, water and spirit.

Organizational structure
The overall organizational structure is mostly informal as a blanket non-profit agreement is pending. The structure is primarily geographically based and includes both formal and informal groups, formal groups benefiting from recognition by the organization as a whole.

Tribe
Tribes are the largest regional organizational group within the Spiral Scouts. They consist of a grouping of five or more geographically related clans, circles, or hearths within a state, province, territory, or country. These organizations consist of a coordinator who acts as the primary contact for the Tribe and a Tribal Council consisting of representatives from the various constituent organizations. The council manages most of the operations of the tribe.

Circle
Circles are similar to the traditional scout Troop, consisting of two or more families meeting together for coordinated activities. Within a circle can be multiple hearths, formal or informal, that may meet separately.  A formal process exists to recognize formal circles within a Tribe. A recognized circle can form a bank account specifically for its fundraising and donations.  Recognition also allows circles to administer badges and conduct scout meetings and field trips under the Spiral Scouts title and to access official scout handbooks.

Recently that process includes a provisional proto-circle process that grants formal recognition from the international organization as well as limited access to many of the organizational resources and materials. It also allows access to training and lists the circle on the organization's website. This provisional status lasts for three months and provides a circle number that becomes active when the circle is officially chartered. Proto-circles are not allowed to hold scout meetings or field trips, only organizational meetings. Fund raising and donations are also restricted only to cover the costs of chartering the circle and must be approved.

Hearth
Hearths are the smallest structure within SpiralScouts. They are generally one or two family groups that may meet separately as a result of lack of local interest or distance from larger circles. Hearths can also function as subdivisions within a circle to organize by age, small scale geography, or similar interests.  Independent hearths can obtain the same recognition as a circle through the national organization to provide charter benefits to low-access areas.

Age groups
Scouts are grouped by age range, with "RainDrops" being ages 3–5, "FireFlies" who are ages 5–8, the eponymous "SpiralScouts" ranging in age from 9 through 14, and participants aged 14 through 18 being called "PathFinders."

References

External links
 Official website

1999 establishments in Washington (state)
Modern pagan organizations based in the United States
Organizations established in 1999
Non-aligned Scouting organizations in the United States
Wicca in the United States
Wiccan organisations
Modern pagan organizations established in the 1990s